Moubamba is a surname. Notable people with the surname include:

Bruno Ben Moubamba (born 1967), Gabonese politician
Cédric Moubamba (born 1979), Gabonese footballer